The Stubaitalbahn (Stubai Valley Railway) is an  long narrow gauge interurban tram from Innsbruck to Fulpmes in Tyrol, Austria. In the city of Innsbruck, it uses the local tramway tracks. At the Stubaital station, the branch line-rated part begins. The meter gauge track starts at Innsbruck's Main station, crosses the Wilten district, and passes the villages of Natters, Mutters, Kreith, and Telfes.  Between the Stubaital station and Fulpmes, the railway is single-track, but at nine stations: Sonnenburgerhof, Hölltal, Mutters, Nockhofweg Muttereralmbahn, Feldeler, Kreith, Telfer Wiesen, Luimes, Telfes, there are passing loops where the train usually uses the left-hand track. The final station, Fulpmes, has three tracks and one depot.

References 

Metre gauge railways in Austria
Light rail in Austria
Transport in Tyrol (state)
Railway lines opened in 1904